Cousso is a Portuguese freguesia ("civil parish") in the municipality of Melgaço. The population in 2011 was 294, in an area of 7.23 km2.

Architecture

 Chapel of Senhora da Boa Morte
 Chapel of São Tiago
 Cross of Cousso
 Church of São Tiago

References

Freguesias of Melgaço, Portugal